Dejan Janković (Serbian Cyrillic: Дејан Јанковић; born 6 January 1986) is a Serbian football midfielder who plays for Radnički Sremska Mitrovica.

References

External links
 18 Јанковић Дејан at http://fkvozdovac.rs
 Dejan Janković at jelenfootball.com
 
 Stats at utakmica.rs 
 

1986 births
Living people
People from Bečej
Association football midfielders
Serbian footballers
FK Jedinstvo Ub players
FK Hajduk Beograd players
FK Radnički Obrenovac players
FK Srem players
FK Leotar players
FK Voždovac players
FK Velež Mostar players
FK Radnik Bijeljina players
Serbian SuperLiga players